Vittor is a surname. Notable people with the surname include:

Frank Vittor (1888–1968), American sculptor
Sergio Vittor (born 1989), Argentine footballer

See also
Victor (name)